The Palmetto Historic District is a nationally recognized historic district, bounded by Twenty-first Avenue, Seventh Street, Fifth Avenue, and the Manatee River in Palmetto, Florida. It  was added to the National Register of Historic Places in 1986. The district includes the Palmetto Historical Park and the various historical buildings and museums it contains.  It also includes the 1930-built building of the Palmetto Women's Club, which was listed on the National Register earlier in 1986.  And it includes the 1914-built Carnegie library whose construction was a major accomplishment of the 1900-founded women's club. 

In 1985, the  area included 292 buildings, 208 of which were deemed contributing buildings.  The 84 non-contributing ones are not terribly instrusive, as they "generally respect the setback, scale and proportions of the contributing buildings."

Gallery

References

External links

 Manatee County listings at National Register of Historic Places

National Register of Historic Places in Manatee County, Florida
Historic districts on the National Register of Historic Places in Florida